Josip Šarac (born 24 February 1998) is a Croatian handball player for Frisch Auf Göppingen and the Croatian national team.

He represented Croatia at the 2020 European Men's Handball Championship.

Honours
Celje
Slovenian First League: 2019–20
Slovenian Supercup: 2019

References

External links

1998 births
Living people
People from Ljubuški
Croatian male handball players
Croats of Bosnia and Herzegovina
Expatriate handball players